{{Infobox film
| name           = Fat Guy Goes Nutzoid
| image          = ZeistersVHS.jpg
| image_size     =
| caption        = VHS cover for Fat Guy Goes Nutzoid!!'
| director       = John Golden
| producer       = Emily Dillon
| writer         = 
| narrator       =
| starring       = Mark AlfredJoan AllenTibor FeldmanPeter Linari
| music          = Leo Kottke
| cinematography = John Drake
| editing        = Jeffrey Wolf
| studio         = Golden Boy Productions
| distributor    = Troma Entertainment
| released       = 
| runtime        = 
| country        = United States
| language       = English
| budget         =
}}Fat Guy Goes Nutzoid is a 1986 film produced by Golden Boys Productions.

ProductionFat Guy Goes Nutzoid was shot in 1983 under the title Zeisters.

ReleaseFat Guy Goes Nutzoid was distributed in September 1986 by Troma.

Reception
A reviewer credited as "Lor." of Variety'' reviewed the film on April 11, 1987. "Lor." described the film as a "tasteless effort" noting that it looked like a backyard home movie and that it contained "cheap, vulgar gags", concluding the film was a "dud".

References

Sources

External links

1986 films
1986 comedy films
Troma Entertainment films
American comedy films
1980s English-language films
1980s American films